Chelkakovo (Salqaq) is a rural locality (a selo) and the administrative centre of Chelkakovsky Selsoviet, Burayevsky District, Bashkortostan, Russia. The population was 754 as of 2010. There are 12 streets.

Geography 
Chelkakovo is located 40 km southwest of Burayevo (the district's administrative centre) by road. Novobikmetovo is the nearest rural locality.

References 

Rural localities in Burayevsky District